Lena Goeßling (born 8 March 1986) is a German former footballer. She played as a midfielder.

Career

Club
Goeßling began her career at her local football club SV Löhne-Obernbeck. She later joined FC Gütersloh 2000, where she won the German Under-17 championship. Goeßling played two seasons in the second Bundesliga with Gütersloh, before joining the top division side SC 07 Bad Neuenahr in 2006. After five years and 97 games for the club, she announced her transfer to VfL Wolfsburg for the 2011–12 season.

After the 2020–21 season, she announced her retirement.

International

Goeßling won the 2004 FIFA U-19 Women's World Championship with Germany. She had three appearances for the team and scored twice in the first group game against Thailand. Two years later, she again competed at the 2006 FIFA U-20 Women's World Championship. Now a regular starter, she was eliminated with her team in the quarter-finals against the United States.

In February 2008, Goeßling made her debut for the German national team against China. Twice she has been denied a place in a German squad at international tournaments. She was named to the 26 player preliminary squads at the 2008 Summer Olympics and the 2009 European Championship, but failed to make the final 21 player squad at both tournaments. Goeßling has been called up for the 2011 FIFA Women's World Cup, which was her first major tournament.

She was part of the squad for the 2016 Summer Olympics, where Germany won the gold medal.

She announced her retirement after the 2019 FIFA Women's World Cup.

International goals
Scores and results list Germany's goal tally first:

Source:

Honours

International
Summer Olympic Games: Gold medal, 2016
UEFA Women's Championship: Winner 2013
Algarve Cup: Winner 2012, 2014
FIFA U-20 Women's World Cup: Winner 2004
UEFA Women's Under-19 Championship: Runner-up 2004

Club
VfL Wolfsburg
UEFA Women's Champions League : Winner 2012–13, 2013–14
Bundesliga : Winner 2012–13, 2013–14, 2016–17, 2017–18, 2018–19
DFB Pokal : Winner 2012–13, 2014–15, 2015–16, 2016–17, 2017–18, 2018–19

Individual
IFFHS World's Best Woman Playmaker: 2013
UEFA Women's Championship All-Star Team: 2013
Silbernes Lorbeerblatt: Winner 2016
IFFHS Women's World Team: 2020
IFFHS World's Woman Team of the Decade 2011–2020
IFFHS UEFA Woman Team of the Decade 2011–2020

See also
 List of women's footballers with 100 or more caps

References

External links

 
 Player German domestic football stats at DFB 
 
 
 
 

1986 births
Living people
Sportspeople from Bielefeld
German women's footballers
SC 07 Bad Neuenahr players
VfL Wolfsburg (women) players
2011 FIFA Women's World Cup players
2015 FIFA Women's World Cup players
Women's association football midfielders
Germany women's international footballers
Footballers at the 2016 Summer Olympics
Olympic gold medalists for Germany
Olympic medalists in football
Medalists at the 2016 Summer Olympics
Frauen-Bundesliga players
Footballers from North Rhine-Westphalia
Olympic footballers of Germany
UEFA Women's Championship-winning players
FIFA Century Club
2019 FIFA Women's World Cup players
UEFA Women's Euro 2017 players